The 2000 East Carolina Pirates football team was an American football team that represented East Carolina University as a member of Conference USA during the 2000 NCAA Division I-A football season. In their ninth season under head coach Steve Logan, the team compiled a 8–4 record. The Pirates offense scored 370 points while the defense allowed 256 points.

Schedule

References

East Carolina
Houston Bowl champion seasons
East Carolina Pirates football seasons
East Carolina Pirates football